Nadia Echeverría Alam (born 14 January 1995) is an American-Venezuelan tennis player.

She has career-high WTA rankings of 758 in singles, achieved on 22 April 2013, and 479 in doubles, reached on 2 May 2016. Echeverría Alam has won six ITF doubles titles.

She made her WTA Tour main-draw debut at the 2016 Copa Colsanitas in the doubles event, partnering with Yuliana Lizarazo.

ITF finals

Singles: 2 (2 runner–ups)

Doubles: 17 (6 titles, 11 runner–ups)

External links
 
 

American female tennis players
Venezuelan female tennis players
1995 births
Living people
21st-century American women